The canton of Monts du Réquistanais is an administrative division of the Aveyron department, southern France. It was created at the French canton reorganisation which came into effect in March 2015. Its seat is in Réquista.

It consists of the following communes:
 
Arvieu
Auriac-Lagast
Calmont
Cassagnes-Bégonhès
Comps-la-Grand-Ville
Connac
Durenque
Lédergues
Réquista
Rullac-Saint-Cirq
Sainte-Juliette-sur-Viaur
Saint-Jean-Delnous
Salmiech
La Selve

References

Cantons of Aveyron